Edward Garland (1826 – 4 September 1882) was an English cricketer. Garland's batting style is unknown. He was born at Kennington, Surrey.

Garland made a single first-class appearance for Surrey against Kent at The Oval in 1846. His second appearance in first-class cricket came in 1853 for the Surrey Club against the Marylebone Cricket Club at The Oval. In his two first-class matches, Garland scored a total of 6 runs from three innings, with a high score of 3.

He died at the place of his birth on 4 September 1882.

References

External links

1826 births
1882 deaths
People from Kennington
English cricketers
Surrey cricketers
Surrey Club cricketers